Gerolimenas is a picturesque small coastal village and a community in the municipal unit of Oitylo, at the southern end of the Mani Peninsula, in Laconia, Peloponnese, Greece. The name, which means "Old Harbour", is thought to derive from the ancient "Ἱερός Λιμήν" (Hieros Limen), meaning "Sacred Harbor". One of the remotest settlements in the Peloponnese, until the 1970s it was reached mainly by boat. In the past it was a major fishing center, and featured substantial infrastructure such as a shipyard, ice supplies, and a fish market. Today the main industry is tourism. According to the 2011 census its population was 99 inhabitants (including the village Ochia).

References

Populated places in Laconia
Populated places in the Mani Peninsula
East Mani